Phyllastrephus is a songbird genus in the bulbul family Pycnonotidae. Most of the species in the genus are typical greenbuls, though two are brownbuls, and one is a leaflove.

Taxonomy and systematics
The genus Phyllastrephus was introduced by the English naturalist William John Swainson in 1832 with Le Jaboteur (Levaillant), now the terrestrial brownbul, as the type species. The genus name combines the Ancient Greek phullon  meaning "leaf" with strephō meaning "to toss" or "to turn".

Species
The genus contains the following 20 species:

 Lowland tiny greenbul (Phyllastrephus debilis)
 Montane tiny greenbul (Phyllastrephus albigula)
 White-throated greenbul (Phyllastrephus albigularis)
 Xavier's greenbul (Phyllastrephus xavieri)
 Icterine greenbul (Phyllastrephus icterinus)
 Terrestrial brownbul (Phyllastrephus terrestris)
 Cameroon olive greenbul (Phyllastrephus poensis)
 Northern brownbul (Phyllastrephus strepitans)
 Grey-olive greenbul (Phyllastrephus cerviniventris)
 Fischer's greenbul (Phyllastrephus fischeri)
 Cabanis's greenbul (Phyllastrephus cabanisi)
 Placid greenbul (Phyllastrephus placidus)
 Red-tailed leaflove (Phyllastrephus scandens)
 Sassi's olive greenbul (Phyllastrephus lorenzi)
 Yellow-streaked greenbul (Phyllastrephus flavostriatus)
 Sharpe's greenbul (Phyllastrephus alfredi)
 Grey-headed greenbul (Phyllastrephus poliocephalus)
 Toro olive greenbul (Phyllastrephus hypochloris)
 Baumann's olive greenbul (Phyllastrephus baumanni)
 Pale-olive greenbul (Phyllastrephus fulviventris)

Former species
Several species from Madagascar that were formerly placed in the genus Phyllastrephus have now been moved into Bernieria and Xanthomixis. Commonly called the Bernieria and the tetrakas, these species are not bulbuls but Malagasy warblers similar to greenbuls due to convergent evolution. Formerly, some authorities also considered the following species (or subspecies) as species within the genus Phyllastrephus:
Honeyguide greenbul (as Phyllastrephus indicator)
Simple greenbul (as Pyrrhurus simplex)
Swamp palm bulbul (as Phyllastrephus leucopleurus)

References

 
 
Taxonomy articles created by Polbot